The Swiss Formula Three Championship is a Level 2 European Formula Three car racing series made up of circuit races and also hillclimbs. Despite its name, the bulk of the series events was held in neighbouring countries due to the legal difficulties of organising motorsport events in Switzerland and the lack of available facilities in Switzerland. Most events were held in Italy and France. The series however did have a prominent role in promoting Swiss drivers. The championship folded in 2009, but restarted again in 2014. The Swiss Formula 3 Cup now is a championship run for Swiss drivers only that participate in the Remus Formula 3 Championships, Cup races simultaneously held with the Austria Formula 3 Cup.

Champions
All champions were Swiss-registered.

References

External links
Swiss Formula 3 Championship at forix.com

 
Formula racing series
Recurring sporting events established in 1977
1977 establishments in Switzerland
Formula Three series
Formula 3